A berth is a bed or sleeping accommodation on vehicles.  Space accommodations have contributed to certain common design elements of berths.

Beds in boats or ships

While beds on large ships are little different from those on shore, the lack of space on smaller yachts means that bunks must be fit in wherever possible. Some of these berths have specific names:

V-berth Frequently yachts have a bed in the extreme forward end of the hull (usually in a separate cabin called the forepeak). Because of the shape of the hull this bed is basically triangular, though most also have a triangular notch cut out of the middle of the aft end, splitting it partially into two separate beds and making it more of a V shape, hence the name. This notch can usually be filled in with a detachable board and cushion, creating something more like a double bed (though with drastically reduced space for the feet; 12" wide is typical). The term "V-berth" is not widely used in the UK, instead the cabin as a whole (the forepeak) is usually referred to.

Settee berth The archetypal layout for a small yacht has seats running down both sides of the cabin, with a table in the middle. At night, these seats can usually be used as beds. Because the ideal ergonomic distance between a seat-back and its front edge (back of the knee) makes for a rather narrow bed, good settee berths will have a system for moving the back of the settee out of the way; this can reveal a surprisingly wide bunk, often running right out to the hull side underneath the lockers. If they are to be used at sea, settee berths must have lee-cloths to prevent the user falling out of bed. Sometimes the settee forms part of a double bed for use in harbour, often using detachable pieces of the table and extra cushions. Such beds are not usually referred to as settee berths.  

Pilot berth A narrow berth high up in the side of the cabin, usually above and behind the back of the settee and right up under the deck. Sometimes the side of this bunk is "walled in" up to the sleeper's chest; there may even be small shelves or lockers on the partition so that the bed is "behind the furniture". The pilot berth is so called because originally they were so small and uncomfortable that nobody slept in them most of the time; only the pilot, if he had to spend a night on board, would be offered it.

Quarter berth A single bunk tucked under the cockpit. Usually found in smaller boats where there is not room for a cabin in this location.

Lee cloths Are sheets of canvas or other fabric attached to the open side of the bunk (very few are open all round) and usually tucked under the mattress during the day or when sleeping in harbour. The lee cloth keeps the sleeping person in the bunk from falling out when the boat  heels during sailing or rough weather.

Berths in trains
Long-distance trains running at night usually have sleeping compartments with sleeping berths.  In the case of compartments with two berths, one is on top of the other in a double-bunk arrangement. These beds (the lower bed in a double-bunk arrangement) are usually designed in conjunction with seats which occupy the same space, and each can be folded away when the other is in use.

Sleeper trains are very common especially in Europe, India and China. Sleeper trains usually consist of single or double-berth compartments as well as couchette which have 4 or 6 berths (consisting of a bottom, middle and top bunk on each side of the compartment).

Open section berths

The berths clustered in compartments contrasted with the berths in the open sections of Pullman cars in the United States, common until the 1950s. In these cars passengers faced each other in facing seats during the day. Porters pulled down the upper berth, and brought the lower seats together to create the lower berth. All of these berths faced the aisle running down the center of the sleeping car. Each berth had a curtain for privacy away from the aisle.

Berths in long-distance trucks
Long-haul truckers sleep in berths known as sleeper cabs contained within their trucks. The sleeper-berth's size and location is typically regulated.

See also
Couchette car
Pullman car

References

Beds
Nautical terminology
Passenger rail transport
Ship compartments